Anonychomyrma biconvexa is a species of ant in the genus Anonychomyrma. Described by Santschi in 1928, the species is endemic to Australia.

References

Anonychomyrma
Hymenoptera of Australia
Insects described in 1928